There have been two baronetcies created for persons with the surname Hawkins, both in the Baronetage of Great Britain. One creation is extant as of 2008.

The Hawkins Baronetcy, of Kelston in the County of Somerset, was created in the Baronetage of Great Britain on 25 July 1778 for Cæsar Hawkins, Serjeant-Surgeon to George II and George III. Cæsar Hawkins, son of Reverend E. Hawkins, younger son of the first Baronet, was also a distinguished surgeon. The third Baronet was High Sheriff of Somerset for 1807.

The Hawkins Baronetcy, of Trewithen in the County of Cornwall, was created in the Baronetage of Great Britain on 28 July 1791 for Christopher Hawkins, Member of Parliament for St Michaels, Grampound, Penryn and St Ives. The title became extinct on his death in 1829.

Hawkins baronets, of Kelston (1778)

Sir Cæsar Hawkins, 1st Baronet (1711–1786)
Sir Cæsar Hawkins, 2nd Baronet (c. 1781–1793)
Sir John Cæsar Hawkins, 3rd Baronet (1782–1861)
Sir John Cæsar Hawkins, 4th Baronet (1837–1929)
Sir John Scott Cæsar Hawkins, 5th Baronet (1875–1939)
Sir Villiers Godfrey Cæsar Hawkins, 6th Baronet (1890–1955)
Sir Humphry Villiers Cæsar Hawkins, 7th Baronet (1923–1993)
Sir Howard Cæsar Hawkins, 8th Baronet (1956–1999)
Sir Richard Cæsar Hawkins, 9th Baronet (born 1958)

Hawkins baronets, of Trewithen (1791)

Sir Christopher Hawkins, 1st Baronet (1758–1829)

References

Kidd, Charles, Williamson, David (editors). Debrett's Peerage and Baronetage (1990 edition). New York: St Martin's Press, 1990.

Baronetcies in the Baronetage of Great Britain
Extinct baronetcies in the Baronetage of Great Britain
1778 establishments in Great Britain